Dickel is a municipality in Germany. It may also refer to:

People
 Dickel (surname), list of people with the surname

Other
 George Dickel, brand of Tennessee whisky